The G. V. Tillman House is a historic home in Lake Wales, Florida. It is located at 301 East Sessoms Avenue. On August 31, 1990, it was added to the U.S. National Register of Historic Places.

References

External links
 Polk County listings at National Register of Historic Places
 Polk County listings at Florida's Office of Cultural and Historical Programs

Houses on the National Register of Historic Places in Florida
Buildings and structures in Lake Wales, Florida
National Register of Historic Places in Polk County, Florida
Houses in Polk County, Florida